Commonwealth District may refer to:
 Commonwealth District, Grand Bassa County, Liberia
 Commonwealth District, Grand Cape Mount County, Liberia
Commonwealth District, Montserrado County, Liberia
 Commonwealth District (VHSL), a high school sports conference in Virginia, United States

See also
 Commonwealth (disambiguation)